Hani Bahjat Tabbara (born 1939) is a retired Jordanian diplomat.

Career
In 1963, he joined the Jordanian government service.

From 1971 to 1973, he served as the Counselor at the embassy in London. From 1973 to 1976, he served as the Minister Plenipotentiary in London. From 1977 to 1980, he served as the ambassador in Rabat. 

From 1980 to 1982, he served as the ambassador in Bucharest (Romania). On  he served as concurrently accredited in East Berlin. From 1982 to 1984, he served as the ambassador in Riyadh (Saudi Arabia). From  to 1986, he served as the ambassador in London. From  to  he served as the ambassador in Berlin (East Germany)

From 1999 to 2001, he served as the Inspector General of Ministry of Foreign Affairs.

From 2001 to 2003, he served as the Secretary General of the Ministry of Foreign Affairs. From 2003 to 2005, he served as appointed a member of the Senate.

References

1939 births
Living people
Ambassadors of Jordan to Morocco
Ambassadors of Jordan to Romania
Ambassadors of Jordan to Saudi Arabia
Ambassadors of Jordan to the United Kingdom
Ambassadors of Jordan to Turkey
Ambassadors of Jordan to East Germany
Ambassadors of Jordan to Australia
Members of the Senate of Jordan